The Treasury of Atreus or Tomb of Agamemnon is a large tholos or beehive tomb constructed between 1400 and 1200 BCE in Mycenae, Greece.

It is the largest and most elaborate tholos tomb known to have been constructed in the Aegean Bronze Age, and one of the last to have been built in the Argolid. The main tomb consisted of a circular burial chamber, or thalamos, topped with a corbelled dome. This dome was the largest in the world until the Roman period, and remains the world's largest corbelled dome. Originally, the façade was decorated with marble columns and sculptures, which used marble from the Mani Peninsula in the southern Peloponnese. Its artwork has been suggested to have been inspired by that of Minoan Crete and of Ancient Egypt.

Little is known of the persons who might have been buried in the tomb: the identification with the mythical Atreus and Agamemnon likely dates to the 18th century. The immense labour involved in the construction of the tomb, as well as the similarities between the architecture of the tholos and the structures of the citadel of Mycenae, has led to suggestions that it may have been intended for a ruler of Mycenae, and represent Mycenae's increasingly dominant status in the later part of the Bronze Age.

The tomb was first excavated in the 19thcentury, when parts of the marble sculptures of its façade were removed by the British aristocrat Thomas Bruce, 7th Earl of Elgin and the Ottoman governor Veli Pasha. It was partly excavated by Heinrich Schliemann, and more fully by Panagiotis Stamatakis, in the 1870s. Throughout the 20th century, the British School at Athens made a series of excavations in and around the tomb, led by Alan Wace, which primarily aimed to settle the difficult question of the date of its construction.

Name

Mythology

In Greek mythology, Atreus was the son of Hippodamia and Pelops, the king of Pisa in the western Peloponnese. In the version of the myth recounted by Hyginus, Atreus and his brother Thyestes killed their half-brother Chrysippus by casting him into a well out of jealousy, urged on by their mother. As a punishment for their crime, they were banished to Mycenae, where Hippodamia is variously said to have died by suicide or further exiled herself to Midea.

Atreus and Thyestes quarrelled for the throne of Mycenae: first, Thyestes gained it after Atreus' wife, Aerope, gave a golden lamb from Atreus' flock to Thyestes and then tricked him into agreeing that whoever held the lamb should become king. Atreus in turn managed to regain the throne after Hermes persuaded Thyestes to hand the kingship to Atreus if the sun were to rise in the west and set in the east, and then Helios altered the usual course of the sun so that it did exactly that. Finally, Atreus banished Thyestes after tricking him into eating the flesh of his own sons.

On the advice of an oracle, Thyestes had a son by his daughter, Pelopia, as it was foretold that this son would kill Atreus. When the infant, Aegisthus, was born, his mother abandoned him, but he was found by a shepherd and given to Atreus to raise; when Aegisthus entered adulthood, Thyestes revealed the truth of his parentage. Aegisthus killed Atreus and ruled Mycenae jointly with Thyestes.

The heroes Agamemnon and Menelaus were the twin sons of Atreus, sometimes known as the Atreides in Greek literature. After their father's murder, they took refuge with Tyndareus, king of Sparta: later, with Menelaus' assistance, Agamemnon overthrew Aegisthus and Thyestes and became king of Mycenae. However, Aegisthus would, along with Agamemnon's wife Clytemnestra, kill Agamemnon on his return from the Trojan War, before being himself killed by Agamemnon's son, Orestes.

Modern name

The precise origin of the name is uncertain, but it probably dates to the 18th century. The tomb was visible in Antiquity, but not associated with Atreus or Agamemnon when Pausanias visited in the 2nd century CE, since he describes the graves of both rulers as being within the walls of Mycenae. After Pausanias, there are no documented accounts of travellers visiting Mycenae until 1700, when the Venetian engineer and surveyor Francesco Vandeyk identified both the Lion Gate and the tomb now known as the 'Treasury of Atreus', which he conjectured was the tomb of a king. Claude-Louis Fourmont, who visited Mycenae in 1729–1730, used the name 'Tomb of Atreus' for the monument: by the time Edward Daniel Clarke visited at the beginning of the 19th century, he could report a tradition that the tomb was known as 'Treasury of Atreus' and identified with the tomb of Agamemnon mentioned in Pausanias. 

The nearby tombs known as the Tomb of Clytemnestra and Tomb of Aegisthus are so named by association with the Treasury of Atreus.

Construction 

The Treasury of Atreus is the largest and most elaborate of the known Mycenaean tholos tombs. It follows the typical typical tripartite division of these tombs into a narrow rectangular passageway (dromos), joined by a deep doorway (stomion) to a burial chamber (thalamos) surmounted by a corbelled dome. The dome was covered with earth to heighten it; some of this mound remains, but erosion has reduced its height and moved its apex towards the west.

The dromos of the tomb is oriented east-west and is 36m long by 6m wide. For the first 19 metres from the stomion, the sides are dressed with conglomerate stone walls: while the dromoi of earlier tombs had been lined with rubble or poros ashlar, the Treasury of Atreus is the first tomb at Mycenae to be fully lined with conglomerate. The source of this conglomerate is likely to have been local to Mycenae. Wace estimates the total volume of masonry in the dromos at over 600 m3, or a weight of over 1200 tons. The height of the walls increases from 0.5m at the eastern end to 10m at the façade; their thickness correspondingly increases from around 2m at the eastern entrance to around 3m at the western entrance nearest to the façade, reflecting the additional pressure of the earth behind the walls as well as from the façade they support. The ashlar walls are bonded by yellow 'Plesia' clay, a mortar commonly used in Mycenaean architecture. 

The façade of the stomion is 10.5m high, with a doorway 5.4m high, 2.7m wide and 5.4m deep. On top of this doorway are two lintel blocks, the innermost of which is 8m in length, 5m in width and 1.2m thick: with a weight of around 120 tons, it is the heaviest single piece of masonry known from Greek architecture and may have required up to 1,000 people to transport it to the tomb. Above the doorway is a 'relieving triangle', an innovation first used at Mycenae on the earlier Tomb of Aegisthus to reduce the stress placed upon the lintel. This triangle is believed to have originally been decorated with sculpture. It has been suggested that the scale of the relieving triangle was intended to symbolise the power to harness resources.

Due to the fragmentary and scattered nature of the remains, there are various reconstructions of the decoration of the façade. The door was flanked by semi-engaged columns in green marble, with zig-zag motifs on the shaft. Two smaller half-columns were placed on either side of the relieving triangle, while red marble was used to create a frieze with rosettes above the architrave of the door, and spiral decoration in bands of red marble that closed the triangular aperture. In the 1960s, Richard Hope Simpson, along with Reynold Higgins and S.E. Ellis, demonstrated that the red marble, known as rosso antico, came from quarries on the Mani peninsula, and suggested that it was 'highly probable' that the green marble traced to the same source. This red marble was later known as lapis Taenarius after Cape Taenarum. Two reliefs in gypsum (the only such use of the material in the tomb), carved with the image of bulls, may have decorated either the façade or the side chamber. The empty 'relieving triangle' above the lintel of the façade served to direct the weight of the dome away from the centre of the lintel, reducing the stress placed upon it. Christos Tsountas suggested that the façade may have included an alabaster cornice, since fragments of a similar structure were found in the Tomb of Clytemnestra, which he believed to be contemporary with 'Atreus': however, recent re-evaluation of the Tomb of Clytemnestra has suggested that it may have been built up to two centuries later, making this suggestion hypothetical at best.  

The thalamos is made up of 33 courses of ashlar masonry (cut and worked limestone), 14.5m in diameter and 13.2m high. It was initially constructed by the excavation of a cylindrical cavity from the hillside, which was then built up with masonry into a corbelled dome. Traces of nails hammered into the interior have been recovered, which have been interpreted as evidence for decorations, perhaps golden rosettes, once hung from the inside dome. A 2.5-meter-high doorway on the northern side of the inner chamber leads into a 6-meter square side chamber: along with the Treasury of Minyas at Orchomenos in Boeotia, which appears to be built to the same plan, the Treasury of Atreus is the only known Mycenaean tholos with a side chamber. Most scholars consider this to have been the location of any burials that were made inside the tomb, though no direct evidence of such burials has survived; Alan Wace, however, believed that it was used as an ossuary to which the remains of previous burials were relocated while further internments were made in the main thalamos. The tomb was the tallest and widest stone dome in the world for over a thousand years, until the Roman period, which saw the construction of the “Temple of Mercury” (actually part of a bath complex) at Baiae in the late 1st century BCE or early 1st century CE and of the Pantheon in Rome in the 2nd century CE. Both of these are "true" domes, as opposed to corbelled domes, making the Treasury of Atreus the world's largest corbelled dome.

The earthen tumulus above the tomb was originally supported by a retaining wall of poros stone, which is preserved to a height of 1.5m and a thickness of around 1m. It is believed that this poros stone was quarried in the hills north-west of Mycenae, in the direction of Nemea. A terrace, approximately 27m in both length and breadth, was constructed in front of the tomb.

James Wright has described the construction of tholos tombs as a 'monumental expression of power', and highlighted the connections between the architecture of the tomb and that of the broadly-contemporary fortifications and palace on the acropolis. In particular, Wright draws attention to the resemblance between the relieving triangle and the sculpted relief of the Lion Gate, and the heavy use of conglomerate on the tomb, which is used within the citadel to accentuate key architectural features, particularly column and anta bases, thresholds and door jambs. It has also been suggested that the tapering sides and inward slant of the doorway may have been inspired by Ancient Egyptian architecture, while the running-spiral motif on the upper half-columns may trace back to Minoan art.

Little is known about the organisation of the tomb's construction or the workers who built it. Elizabeth French has suggested that the same workforce who constructed the LH III megaron (the so-called 'Palace III') on the acropolis may subsequently have been used to construct the Treasury of Atreus, and that they may have been worked as part of a corvée system. It has been calculated that the construction of the tomb required at least 20,000 worker-days of labour, and estimated that it may have occupied up to 1600 people and been a years- or decades-long project. 

Nothing is known of who might have been buried inside the tomb, though it is generally considered to have been an elite or royal figure, perhaps a ruler of the site or somebody close to its rulers.

Date 

The date of the tomb has historically been controversial, though most scholars would now date it to  1400–1250 BCE. In the early 20th century, it was the focus of a debate between Arthur Evans and Alan Wace, which became known as the 'Helladic Heresy'. After the beginnings of his excavations of Knossos from 1900, Evans began increasingly to argue for a distinction between the 'Minoan' civilisation of Crete and the 'Mycenaean' civilisation of the mainland. Although he had used the terms 'Minoan' and 'Mycenaean' interchangeably for his findings on Crete during the first two years of excavation, Evans came to follow the German archaeologist Arthur Milchhöfer in arguing that the origins of Mycenaean civilisation lay on Crete: specifically, through the 'domination' of the mainland of Greece by 'Minoan dynasts'. In 1918, however, Wace published an article entitled 'The Pre-Mycenaean Pottery of the Mainland' along with Carl Blegen, whose own excavations at Korakou in Corinthia in 1915–1916 had convinced him that substantial differences existed between 'Minoan' and 'Helladic' culture in the Late Bronze Age. In their article, Wace and Blegen argued for the essential continuity of mainland-Greek, or 'Helladic', culture from the early to late Bronze Age, and that 'Mycenaean' civilisation (which then referred specifically to the period now designated as the Late Helladic). Mycenaean culture, they argued, was 'not merely transplanted from Crete, but [was] the fruit of the cultivated Cretan graft set on the wild stock of the mainland'. Moreover, while they accepted the influence of Crete on mainland Greece during the Middle Helladic period, they argued that the culture of the mainland remained 'Mycenaean as opposed to Cretan', and that it was 'inconceivable' that Late Helladic culture represented a different 'race' to that of the Early Helladic.

Wace and Blegen's argument stood in direct opposition to Evans' narrative, by which the Shaft Graves of Mycenae, first used in the transition between the Middle Helladic and Late Helladic periods, represented the tombs of the 'Minoan' rulers of Mycenae, and therefore a sharp break with the cultural forms that preceded them. He further argued that the tholoi, particularly the Treasury of Atreus, were not only contemporary with the Shaft Graves but themselves copies of similar-looking structures found on Crete. In the report of his first excavations at Mycenae in 1920, of which he informed Evans by letter, Wace suggested a later date for the Treasury of Atreus of 1400–1200 BCE, rather than the 1600–1500 BCE needed to conform with Evans' theory. This chronological disagreement, and the associated implication that the monumentality and elaboration of Mycenae's funerary forms had increased over the Late Helladic period — which was seen to contradict the idea of the site having been dominated by Cretan rulers — was dubbed the 'Helladic Heresy' by John Percival Droop.

Following further excavations in the 1920s, including that of the Tomb of Aegisthus, which he dated securely to LH IIA and argued as earlier than 'Atreus', Wace dated the tomb to LH III, later giving a terminus ante quem of 1350BCE. This was primarily based on the findings of his 1939 excavation, which showed that the dromos had been dug through the so-called 'Bothros deposit', which included LHIIIA1 material, providing a terminus post quem for its construction.  Most modern treatments consider the construction of the Treasury of Atreus and the fortification of the citadel of Mycenae, including the construction of the Lion Gate, to be broadly contemporary and to belong to the LH III period. However, there is some disagreement about the relative chronology: George Mylonas argued that the fortifications began in LH IIIA2 and that the Treasury of Atreus was constructed in LH IIIB1, contemporary with the final phase of fortification, while William Cavanagh and Christopher Mee, along with Elizabeth French, considered that 'Atreus' belongs to the early part of LH IIIA1.

By LH III, Mycenae and nearby Tiryns were the only sites in the Argolid where tholos tombs were constructed: previously, such tombs had been constructed at Dendra, Kazarma, Berbati, Prosymna and Kokla. Scholars generally consider that the Treasury of Atreus was the penultimate tholos constructed at Mycenae, ahead of the Tomb of Clytemnestra.

A single sherd beneath the threshold of the tomb dates to LH IIIB middle: this is considered to have come to be there during a later refurbishment of the tomb.

Location 

The site of Mycenae is situated in Argolis, in the north-eastern Peloponnese, on the eastern edge of the Argive Plain. The Treasury of Atreus is located to the west side of the modern road leading to the citadel, approximately 500m south-southwest of the Lion Gate.  

The earliest of Mycenae's tholoi were constructed around the Kalkani necropolis, which had previously been used for the earliest chamber tombs. The Lion and Aegisthus tholoi, by contrast, were built much closer to the acropolis, a trend followed by the later Tomb of Clytemnestra. This creates a division of most of Mycenae’s nine tholos tombs into two groups, separated by the Panagia ridge. The greater size and elaboration of the tombs nearer the citadel has led to the suggestion that they are 'more royal' than those on the other side of the Panagia ridge, though the chronological concentration of most of the tholoi in LH IIA, the fact that the smaller Cyclopean and Epano Phournos tholoi predate the grander Lion and Aegisthus tombs, and the fact that ostentatious burials continued in monumental chamber tombs all problematise a straightforward connection between tholos tombs and royalty at Mycenae, at least before LH IIB.

The Treasury of Atreus is set alone at the southern edge of a bowl on the Panagia ridge’s eastern slope. Prior to its construction, the site was occupied by a building, which was demolished to build the tholos. Michael Boyd has suggested that the tomb's position was intended to 'co-opt the traditions of the past without directly competing with the present', since most contemporary burials were made in chamber tombs further from the acropolis. David Mason has drawn attention to the tomb's position alongside a likely Mycenaean route to the acropolis, which perhaps gave it a protective function, and to the views created both of the citadel from the tomb and of the tomb from the citadel, which he argues would have emphasised the connection between the dead interred in the tomb and the living who held power over Mycenae. James Wright has also suggested that the location may have been selected for the greatest possible impact upon those arriving at Mycenae from the south.

The alignment of the dromos is believed to have reflected topographic considerations — it is aligned perpendicular to the slope of the hill, which would have best facilitated its construction.

Post-Mycenaean history

The remains of a seventh-century BCE krater decorated with the image of a horse, found beside the retaining wall of the tumulus, has been taken as evidence of cult activity at the tomb. Unlike the earlier Tomb of Aegisthus and the later Tomb of Clytemnestra, there is little direct evidence of the tomb's use in the post-Mycenaean period, though a bronze pin found in the side chamber and a handful of other bronze objects from the tomb have been suggested as possibly belonging to the Geometric period. In other tombs of Mycenae, post-Mycenaean finds which are not associated with burials have been interpreted as signs of hero cult. Remains of this period in tholos tombs have been seen as a means for the short-lived Argive colony at Mycenae, established in the 3rd century BCE but abandoned within a century, to assert its connection with Mycenae's mythological heroes and so its status and prestige in relation to Argos.

Excavation

In the 19th century, a local tradition believed that the tomb had been once explored by the agha of the nearby village of Karvati, who took from it a bronze lamp. The first securely-documented entrance to the tomb was undertaken by the British aristocrat Thomas Bruce, 7th Earl of Elgin. In 1801, Elgin had tasked his draughtsman, Giovanni Battista Lusieri, and Philip Hunt, a chaplain to the British embassy in Greece, to investigate various archaeological sites in Greece with a view to finding antiquities that might be taken back to Britain. Hunt visited Mycenae in August, and reported the Treasury of Atreus as 'a most stupendous conical subterranean building, quite entire, called by some antiquaries the Tomb of Agamemnon, by others the Royal Treasury of Mycenae'. Hunt also noted that the tomb was not intact, but open to the elements, and that 'floods of rain' and ingress of debris had made access difficult.

Elgin visited on 8 May 1802, crawling, as his wife Mary attested in a letter to her mother, through the tomb's relieving triangle. He asked the voivode of Nafplio to clear the tomb, which was completed by Elgin's return to Mycenae on the 12th: the voivode presented him with fragments of pottery vases, ornamental stonework and a marble vase found within. Elgin also had parts of the columns flanking the doorway removed and shipped to England, along with the fragmentary gypsum reliefs of bulls, and architectural drawings made of the tomb by Sebastiano Ittar.

In June 1810, Veli Pasha, the Ottoman Pasha of the Morea, excavated the monument. He cleared most of the entrance to the tomb and entered the chamber with ladders; according to Heinrich Schliemann's later publication of his own excavations at Mycenae, he discovered 'bones covered with gold', as well as gemstones and other gold and silver objects. Veli Pasha sold some artefacts to the British MPs and antiquarians John Nicholas Fazakerley and Henry Gally Knight, and removed four large fragments of the semi-engaged columns beside the doorway. One of the fragments — last seen in 1815 — became part of a mosque in Argos; Veli Pasha gave the others as a gift to Howe Browne, 2nd Marquess of Sligo, who visited him shortly after the excavations and gave him two fourteen-pounder cannons in exchange. Sligo described the columnar fragments as 'trifles', but had them shipped to his estate at Westport House in County Mayo, Ireland, where they were discovered in a basement by his grandson, George Browne, in 1904. George Browne offered them for 'public benefit' to the British Museum, to be combined with the fragments taken by Elgin and given in 1816 to the museum, in exchange for replicas of the reconstructed columns; they entered the museum in 1905.

Heinrich Schliemann may have explored the tomb during his brief, illegal excavations of Mycenae in 1874. In 1876, he excavated in the side chamber, finding a small pit of unknown purpose; Alan Wace later suggested that it was the base for a column which was never put in. Between 1876 and 1879, Panagiotis Stamatakis cleared the debris from the dromos and entrance of the tomb, recovering fragments of sculpture believed to have come from the relieving triangle.

In 1920 and 1921, archaeologists of the British School at Athens under Alan Wace made small-scale excavations in the tomb for the purposes of establishing its date, including a trench in the dromos. During the campaigns of 1920–1923, which had originally intended to excavate the seven thus-far unexcavated tholoi (that is, all except 'Atreus' and 'Clytemnestra'), Wace had the first architectural plans of the tomb drawn up by Piet de Jong.

Another effort was made in 1939, where Wace dug trenches on the outside of the dromos in line with the façade and beyond the eastern end of the dromos. Wace found that the façade and dromos were bonded together, showing that they were constructed together, and that the dromos had not previously been any larger than its present dimensions. The 1939 excavation also showed that the dromos had been dug through the so-called 'Bothros deposit', which included LHIIIA1 material, providing a terminus post quem for its construction.

In 1955, Wace dug trial trenches in the area around the tomb, containing large quantities of Mycenaean potsherds, which have been interpreted (in line with similar contemporary deposits at the Tomb of Clytemnestra) as offerings made to the tomb's occupants.

Gallery

See also
 List of megalithic sites
 List of world's largest domes

Footnotes

Explanatory notes

References

Bibliography

External links

 
Treasury of Atreus 360° Interactive virtual tour
A different light inside Treasury of Atreus

Buildings and structures completed in the 13th century BC
1879 archaeological discoveries
Domes
Mycenae
Mycenaean_tombs
Mycenaean tholos tombs